Storyworks is a literary magazine published in the United States by Scholastic Inc., for students in grades 3-6 and their teachers. The magazine was founded in 1993 by Scholastic editor Tamara Hanneman. It is published six times during the academic year. Each issue features fiction, nonfiction, poetry and a play. The magazine also publishes numerous writing prompts, word games, contests, and short articles related to reading and writing.  An accompanying Teacher's Edition provides ideas and guidelines for using the magazine in the classroom. It is now edited by Lauren Tarshis, who is also the author of many children's books including the New York Times bestselling "I Survived" series. The Storyworks editorial headquarters are in New York City and its distribution center is in  Jefferson City, Missouri.

References

External links
 
 Official website of Lauren Tarshis.

Children's magazines published in the United States
Monthly magazines published in the United States
Classroom magazines
Magazines established in 1993
Magazines published in Missouri
1993 establishments in Missouri
Scholastic Corporation